Yvon Jean Vautour (born September 10, 1956) is a Canadian former ice hockey coach and former National Hockey League player.

Playing career
As a youth, Vautour played in the 1969 Quebec International Pee-Wee Hockey Tournament with a minor ice hockey team from Saint John, New Brunswick.

Vautour was drafted by the New York Islanders 104th overall in the 1976 NHL Amateur Draft. He played junior hockey with Mike Bossy for the Laval National of the Quebec Major Junior Hockey League.

Coaching career
Vautour was an assistant coach with the Saint John Flames of the American Hockey League from 2001 – 2003. He was the head coach of the Saint John Scorpions for the 2005-06 season, guiding the team to win the Canadian Elite Hockey League championship. Vautour was hired by the Vancouver Canucks as an amateur scout for the 2007–08 NHL season, and he joined the coaching staff of the Saint John Sea Dogs on May 21, 2009.

Regular season and playoffs

References

External links

1956 births
Living people
Canadian ice hockey right wingers
Colorado Rockies (NHL) players
Edmonton Oilers (WHA) draft picks
Fort Worth Texans players
Fredericton Express players
Ice hockey people from New Brunswick
Indianapolis Checkers (CHL) players
Laval National players
Maine Mariners players
Moncton Alpines (AHL) players
Muskegon Mohawks players
New Jersey Devils players
New York Islanders draft picks
New York Islanders players
Quebec Nordiques players
Sportspeople from Saint John, New Brunswick
Vancouver Canucks scouts
Wichita Wind players